Capanne may refer to:

Capanne, Montopoli in Val d'Arno, a village in the province of Pisa, Italy
Capanne, Perugia, a village in the province of Perugia, Italy
Capanne, San Marino, a village in the municipality of Fiorentino, San Marino
Capanne, Sillano Giuncugnano, a village in the province of Lucca, Italy
Borgo Capanne, a village in the Metropolitan city of Bologna, Italy
Capanne di Careggine, a village in the province of Lucca, Italy
Capanne di Marcarolo, a village in the province of Alessandria, Italy
Poggio Capanne, a village in the province of Grosseto, Italy
Mount Capanne, a mountain on the island of Elba in Tuscany, Italy